Andy Clark,  (born 1957) is a British philosopher who is Professor of Cognitive Philosophy at the University of Sussex. Prior to this, he was at professor of philosophy and Chair in Logic and Metaphysics at the University of Edinburgh in Scotland, director of the Cognitive Science Program at Indiana University in Bloomington, Indiana and previously taught at Washington University in St. Louis, Missouri. Clark is one of the founding members of the CONTACT collaborative research project whose aim is to investigate the role environment plays in shaping the nature of conscious experience. Clark's papers and books deal with the philosophy of mind and he is considered a leading scholar  on the subject of mind extension. He has also written extensively on connectionism, robotics and the role and nature of mental representation.

Philosophical work 
Clark's work explores a number of disparate but interrelated themes. Many of these themes run against established wisdom in cognitive processing and representation. According to traditional computational accounts, the function of the mind is understood as the process of creating, storing, and updating internal representations of the world, on the basis of which other processes and actions may take place. Representations are updated to correspond with an environment in accordance with the function, goal-state, or desire of the system in question at any given time. Thus, for example, learning a new route through a maze-like building would be mirrored in a change in the representation of that building. Action, on this view, is the outcome of a process that determines the best way to achieve the goal-state or desire, based on current representations. Such a determinative process may be the purview of a Cartesian "central executive" or a distributed process like homuncular decomposition.

In contrast to traditional models of cognition, which often posit the one-way flow of sensory information from the periphery towards more remote areas of the brain, Clark has suggested a two-way "cascade of cortical processing" underlying perception, action, and learning. The concept of predictive processing lies at the heart of this view, wherein top-down predictions attempt to correctly guess or "explain away" bottom-up sensory information in an iterative, hierarchical manner. Discrepancies between the expected signal and actual signal, in essence, the "prediction error," travel upward to help refine the accuracy of future predictions. Interactions between forward flow of error (conveyed by "error units") and backward flow of prediction are dynamic, with attention playing a key role in weighting the relative influence of either at each level of the cascade (dopamine is mentioned as "one possible mechanism for encoding precision" with regard to error units). Action (or action-oriented predictive processing) also plays an important role in Clark's account as another means by which the brain can reduce prediction error by directly influencing the environment. To this, he adds that "personal, affective, and hedonic" factors would be implicated along with the minimization of prediction error, creating a more nuanced model for the relationship between action and perception.

According to Clark, the computational model, which forms the philosophical foundation of artificial intelligence, engenders several intractable problems. One of the more salient is an information bottleneck: if, in order to determine appropriate actions, it is the job of the mind to construct detailed inner representations of the external world, then, as the world is constantly changing, the demands on the mental system will almost certainly preclude any action taking place. For Clark, we need relatively little information about the world before we may act effectively upon it. We tend to be susceptible to "grand illusion", where our impressions of a richly detailed world obscure a reality of minimal environmental information and quick action. We needn't try to reconstruct the detail of this world, as it is able to serve as its own best model from which to extract information "just in time".

Clark's writings also focus on the concept of transhumanism, most prevalent in his work, Natural-Born Cyborgs which explores the progressing incorporation of human biology and technological implants. Through a series of contemporary technological studies and an evaluation of the cyborg figure in pop-culture, Clark maps out a perception of the cyborg as a reality. This is not necessarily to show what humanity is to become from biologically implanted technology, but rather to explore where humanity is now with said technology. In his own words, humans are "creatures whose minds are special precisely because they are tailor-made for multiple mergers and coalitions." He elaborates this as he describes his body as an "electronic virgin" untouched by technology, but gradually over time technology will become intertwined with his biology. Whether that incorporation will be as mundane as the use of eyeglasses or something more advanced such as a new auditory prosthesis, he believes the merger of technology and biology is inevitable and present.

Extended mind thesis 

Clark is perhaps most well known for his work on the extended mind thesis, which says that the mind extends into the environment. Clark spoke about his thesis in TEDxLambeth 2019.

Personal life
Clark lives in Brighton, England, with his partner, Alexa Morcom, a cognitive neuroscientist. He has a tattoo of a comic book styled, undersea theme.

Bibliography 
Books by Andy Clark:
 Microcognition: Philosophy, Cognitive Science and Parallel Distributed Processing (1989)
 Associative Engines: Connectionism, Concepts and Representational Change (1993)
 Being There: Putting Brain, Body and World Together Again (1997)
 Mindware: An Introduction to the Philosophy of Cognitive Science (2001)
 Natural-Born Cyborgs: Minds, Technologies, and the Future of Human Intelligence (2004)
 Supersizing the Mind: Embodiment, Action, and Cognitive Extension (2008)
 Surfing Uncertainty: Prediction, Action, and the Embodied Mind (2016)
 The Experience Machine: How Our Minds Predict and Shape Reality (2023)

Clark is also on the editorial boards of the following journals:
 Behavioral and Brain Sciences
 Cognitive Science
 Cognitive Science Quarterly
 Connection Science
 Minds and Machines
 Philosophy and Society
 Pragmatics and Cognition

References

External links 
Andy Clark's profile at the University of Sussex
Clark’s papers available online
Excerpt from Natural Born Cyborgs
Interview with Future Now

1957 births
20th-century British philosophers
20th-century essayists
21st-century British philosophers
21st-century essayists
Academics of the University of Edinburgh
Academics of the University of Glasgow
Academics of the University of Sussex
Action theorists
Alumni of the University of Stirling
Analytic philosophers
Artificial intelligence researchers
British logicians
British male essayists
British transhumanists
British consciousness researchers and theorists
Epistemologists
Fellows of the British Academy
Fellows of the Royal Society of Edinburgh
Futurologists
Indiana University Bloomington faculty
Living people
Metaphilosophers
Metaphysicians
Metaphysics writers
Ontologists
Philosophers of culture
Philosophers of logic
Philosophers of mind
Philosophers of science
Philosophers of social science
Philosophers of technology
Philosophy academics
Social philosophers
Washington University in St. Louis faculty